The 2007 BWF World Championships is the 16th tournament of BWF World Championships (World Badminton Championships). It was held in Kuala Lumpur, Malaysia, from 13 to 19 August 2007.

Host city selection
Aarhus and Kuala Lumpur were the candidates for hosting the championships. Kuala Lumpur was later announced as the host during 2005 IBF council meeting in Beijing. China also expressed interest, but ultimately did not bid.

Venue
Putra Indoor Stadium, Bukit Jalil

Participating nations
A total of 55 countries qualified to participating in this tournament. Below is the list of countries with the parentheses indicates the number of players eligible.

 (1)
 (4)
 (3)
 (3)
 (1)
 (4)
 (10)
 (12)
 (24)
 (4)
 (15)
 (2)
 (18)
 (4)
 (2)
 (3)
 (9)
 (13)
 (2)
 (10)
 (21)
 (8)
 (3)
 (1)
 (1)
 (4)
 (15)
 (2)
 (13)
 (1)
 (26)
 (2)
 (1)
 (10)
 (6)
 (3)
 (6)
 (5)
 (3)
 (3)
 (4)
 (9)
 (5)
 (2)
 (10)
 (5)
 (4)
 (5)
 (1)
 (3)
 (5)
 (4)
 (11)
 (1)
 (1)

Notable is, Thailand is the only country announced the withdrawal from the tournament by choosing to attend the World University Games, the event which clash with the Championships, they have several players who qualified for this tournament.

Medalists

Medal table

Events

References

External links
Official website
Tournamentsoftware.com: 2007 World Championships

 
BWF World Championships
World Championships
2007 in Malaysian sport
Sports competitions in Kuala Lumpur
Badminton tournaments in Malaysia
BWF World Championships
August 2007 sports events in Asia
2000s in Kuala Lumpur